Debeikiai is a town in Anykščiai district municipality, in Utena County, in northeast Lithuania. According to the 2011 census, the town has a population of 404 people. Town established near Anykšta river.

Education 
Debeikiai primary school

Famous citizens 
Jurgis Baranauskas (1859–1941), book smuggler.

References

Towns in Utena County
Towns in Lithuania
Vilkomirsky Uyezd
Anykščiai District Municipality